After World War II, Germany was split into several different occupation zones. But later the different occupation zones were merged into East and West Germany. West Germany is where the modern German state gets its current traditions of medals and decorations from.

Federal State Orders

Federally recognized orders

Orders of the German States

Awards of the Federal Ministry of the Interior 
These awards and decorations are awarded by the Minister of Interior to members of the Bundeswehr, Bundespolizei, Technisches Hilfswerk.

Awards of the Federal Ministry of Defence 
These Orders and decorations are all awarded to soldiers of Germany and its allies by the Bundeswehr.

Denazified decorations after 1957 
These awards were reintroduced in 1957 after they had been denazified.

Old royal orders recognized by the state

See also 
 Orders, decorations, and medals of the German states
 Awards and decorations of the German Armed Forces

References 

<references group="

1951 establishments in West Germany
Awards established in 1951
Civil awards and decorations of Germany
Orders, decorations, and medals of Germany
Merit Of The Federal Republic Of Germany, Order of
Orders of merit